Pedro Miguel Ferreira Silva Torrão (born 12 March 1977) is a Portuguese retired footballer who played as a midfielder.

Club career
Born in Vila Franca de Xira, Lisbon District, Torrão made his professional debut with S.C. Salgueiros in January 1998 after unsuccessfully emerging through local U.D. Vilafranquense's youth ranks and having a one-and-a-half-year spell with the farm team of Sporting CP. In the following seasons he played in the two major divisions in Portuguese football, with relative impact; successively, he represented C.F. União de Lamas, S.C. Campomaiorense, F.C. Alverca (which he helped promote from the second division in 2003), U.D. Leiria and S.C. Beira-Mar.

In late January 2007, at nearly 30, Torrão left the Aveiro side and joined AC Omonia, but only lasted there a few months, moving clubs in the country in the summer after signing with Nea Salamis Famagusta FC.

After again failing to impress, he joined a third side in Cyprus, AEL Limassol, in the 2008 off-season, where he firmly established as first-choice in the playmaker position, rejoining former teammate – in Sporting's academy, Alverca and Leiria – Miguel Vargas; also, he suffered a severe hip injury which sidelined him for several months.

References

External links

1977 births
Living people
People from Vila Franca de Xira
Portuguese footballers
Association football midfielders
Primeira Liga players
Liga Portugal 2 players
Segunda Divisão players
U.D. Vilafranquense players
S.C. Salgueiros players
C.F. União de Lamas players
S.C. Campomaiorense players
F.C. Alverca players
U.D. Leiria players
S.C. Beira-Mar players
S.C.U. Torreense players
Cypriot First Division players
AC Omonia players
Nea Salamis Famagusta FC players
AEL Limassol players
Portugal youth international footballers
Portugal under-21 international footballers
Portuguese expatriate footballers
Expatriate footballers in Cyprus
Portuguese expatriate sportspeople in Cyprus
Sportspeople from Lisbon District